The Totonacan languages (also known as Totonac–Tepehua languages) are a family of closely related languages spoken by approximately 290,000 Totonac (approx. 280,000) and Tepehua (approx. 10,000) people in the states of Veracruz, Puebla, and Hidalgo in Mexico. At the time of the Spanish conquest Totonacan languages were spoken all along the gulf coast of Mexico.
During the colonial period, Totonacan languages were occasionally written and at least one grammar was produced. In the 20th century the number of speakers of most varieties have dwindled as indigenous identity increasingly became stigmatized encouraging speakers to adopt Spanish as their main language.

The Totonacan languages have only recently been compared to other families on the basis of historical-comparative linguistics, though they share numerous areal features with other languages of the Mesoamerican Linguistic Area, such as the Mayan languages and Nahuatl. Recent work suggests a possible genetic link to the Mixe–Zoque language family, although this has yet to be firmly established.

Internal classification
The family is divided into two branches, Totonac and Tepehua. Of the two, Tepehua is generally considered to consist of three languages—Pisaflores, Huehuetla, and Tlachichilco—while the Totonac branch is considerably more diverse.  divides Totonac into four divisions, based on :
Papantla Totonac: spoken in El Escolín, Papantla, Cazones, Tajín, Espinal, and other towns along the Gulf Coast of Veracruz.
North-Central Totonac: spoken roughly between Poza Rica in Veracruz and Mecapalapa, Pantepec, and Xicotepec de Juárez in Puebla.
South-Central Totonac: spoken mostly in the Sierra Norte de Puebla, including the towns of Zapotitlán de Méndez, Coatepec, and Huehuetla in Puebla.
Misantla Totonac: spoken in Yecuatla and other communities outside the city of Misantla.

Ethnologue currently recognizes 12 languages in the Totonacan family, three Tepehua languages and nine Totonac:

This classification is the basis of the latest version of the ISO language codes for Totonacan, although some of these classifications are disputed.

The Mexican Instituto Nacional de Lenguas Indígenas (INALI) recognizes 10 distinct languages or "linguistic variants" in the family, 3 Tepehua and 7 Totonac :

Coyutla Totonac is grouped with South Central Totonac by INALI while Tecpatlán Totonac is included in the North Central Totonac group. Other recent attempts at classification have suggested that some of these divisions, particularly North Central, Costal, and South Central, and are far too broad and include varieties that might also be classified as separate languages.

A further drawback of the Ethnologue and INALI classifications is the lack of lower-level subgroups beyond the two-way division into Totonac and Tepehua. In the Totonac branch of the family, Misantla is the most distinctive, and the remaining languages form a more closely related group . Divisions amongst the latter group, which might be referred to as "Central Totonac," are unclear, though most researchers agree that there is at least a three-way division between Northern, Southern/Sierra, and Lowland/Coastal varieties. Recent efforts at reconstruction and evidence from lexical similarity further suggest that Southern/Sierra and Lowland group together against Northern , although this is still uncertain, pending more exhaustive investigation. The most recent proposal for the family is as follows:
Tepehua
Pisaflores
Huehuetla
Tlachichilco
Totonac
Misantla
Central Totonac
Northern Totonac
Upper Necaxa
Tecpatlán Totonac
Zihuateutla Totonac
Cerro Xinolatépetl Totonac (also known as Ozumatlán)
Apapantilla Totonac (also known as Xicotepec)
Lowland–Sierra
Filomeno Mata
Lowland Totonac (many varieties, incl. Papantla)
Sierra Totonac (also known as Highland Totonac)
Coatepec
Coyutla
Huehuetla Totonac
Ozelonacaxtla
Olintla
Zapotitlán de Méndez

Lexical comparison also suggests that, for Tepehua, Pisaflores and Huehuetla may be more closely related to each other than either is to Tlalchichilco .

MacKay and Trechsel (2018) provide the following internal classification:

Totonac-Tepehua
Totonac
Sierra Totonac: Zapotitlán, Coatepec, Huehuetla (Chilocoyo del Carmen), Caxhuácan, Ozelonacaxtla
Papantla Totonac: El Escolín, El Tajín, El Carbón, Papantla
Northern Totonac: Apapantilla, Patla, Chicontla, Cacahuatlán, Filomeno Mata, San Pedro Tlaolantongo
Misantla Totonac: Yecuatla, San Marcos Atexquilapan, Jilotepec
Tepehua
Tlachichileo Tepehua: Tlachichileo, Tierra Colorada, Chintipán, Tecomajapa
Pisaflores Tepehua: Pisaflores, El Tepetate, San Pedro Tziltzacuapan, San José el Salto
Huehuetla Tepehua: Huehuetla (Hidalgo), Barrio Atzlán, Linda Vista (Mirasol), Mecapalapa (Puebla)

Phonology
There is some variation in the sound systems of the different varieties of Totonac and Tepehua, but the following phoneme inventory can be considered a typical Totonacan inventory .

Consonants

Most modern languages phonemically have only one of these, but show some allomorphic variation between the two, with one or the other being considered basic. However, Coatepec Totonac is reported to have both phonemes , and more recent reconstructions of the proto-Totonacan consonant inventory have proposed that both were present in that language. The glottal stop is a marginal phoneme in most of the languages and is posited primarily for morphological reasons. The phonological system is fairly typical of Mesoamerica.

Vowels

Most Totonacan languages have a three-vowel system with each quality making distinctions of length and laryngealization. The following is the "typical" Totonacan vocalic inventory.

Tepehua has lost the phonemic laryngealization of vowels and has ejective stops where Totonac has creaky vowels preceded by stops .

Grammar
From a typological perspective, the Totonac–Tepehua family presents a fairly consistent profile, and exhibits many features of the Mesoamerican areal type, such as a preference for verb-initial order, head-marking, and extensive use of body part morphemes in metaphorical and locative constructions . The Totonacan languages are highly agglutinative and polysynthetic with nominative/accusative alignment and a flexible constituent order governed by information structure. Syntactic relations between the verb and its arguments are marked by agreement with the subject and one or sometimes two objects. There is no morphological case on nouns and many languages in the family lack prepositions, making use instead of a rich system of causatives, applicatives, and prefixes for body parts and parts of objects. Possession is marked on the possessed noun, the head of the NP. Otherwise, nouns are uninflected, number being an optional category and grammatical gender being absent from the languages. Numerals quantifying nouns bear classificatory prefixes, something that is unusual cross-linguistically as affixal classifiers tend heavily to be suffixes . Totonacan languages are also known for their use of sound symbolism.

Causatives and applicatives
Totonacan languages have a wide assortment of morphemes for increasing the valency of a verb.

Causatives
All Totonacan languages have at least one causative morpheme, a prefix ma:- :

In many of the languages, the causative prefix is regularly or obligatorily associated with a suffix:

In some languages like Upper Necaxa, the suffix is analyzed as part of the causative morpheme , but in others it is treated as a separate transitivizer .

Dative/benefactive applicative
One of the most frequently used valency-increasing affixes in the Totonacan languages is the dative or benefactive suffix :

Comitative applicative
All the languages of the family have a comitative construction in which both an actor and a co-actor of a verb are specified . For instance, in Huehuetla Tepehua a verb such as tamakahuːn 'stay, be in a place' is intransitive but can take a comitative prefix to form a verb ta̰ːtamakahuːn meaning 'stay with someone', someone being the co-actor:

Similarly, the Papantla Totonac verb muxuː ‘bury something’ is transitive but becomes ditransitive when it takes the comitative prefix:

Instrumental applicative
The third applicative prefix that is shared across the family is analyzed in most of the languages as an instrumental applicative and is used to add an object used as an instrument or a means to a clause:

In some of the languages, the instrumental can also be used for the expression of motives:

As seen in the last example, this prefix is ɬi- in Tepehua languages rather than liː- as it is in Totonac, and in Tlachichilco  and Huehuetla  it is analyzed as a directional ("DIR") rather than an instrumental. The prefix seems to be less frequent in Tepehua than in Totonac.

Body-part prefixation

The Totonacan languages exhibit a phenomenon similar to noun incorporation whereby special prefixing combining forms of body-parts may be added to verbs , . When these prefixes are added, they generally serve to delimit the verb's locus of affect; that is, they indicate which part of the subject or object is affected by the action.

The prefixes can also be used to specify the shape of an affected object:

It is worthwhile to note that the prefixation does not decrease the valency of the verb, differentiating this process from true noun incorporation as the term is usually understood .

Another important role that bodypart prefixes play in Totonacan languages is in the formulation of expressions of the spatial location of objects, which combine a part-prefix with one of four posture verbs (words for ’sit’, ‘stand’, ‘lie’, and ‘be high’):

These constructions alternate with expressions using the independent (full) form of the part as a preposition-like element:

In the last sentence, the independent form of a̰kpuː- ‘crown’ is formed by combining this prefix with a base -n which is sometimes (as here) analyzed as a nominalizing suffix. Because words for body parts are inflected for possession, a̰kpuːn ‘crown’ has a third-person singular possessive prefix, linking it to mesa ‘table’, the object on whose crown the book is located (see the section below on Possessive constructions).

Possessive constructions
Possessive constructions in Totonacan languages are marked on the possessed noun rather than on the possessor noun:

The person of the possessor is indicated by a prefix and the number of the possessor by a suffix, as shown by the follow paradigm from Upper Necaxa :

In several of the languages, kinship terms and words referring to parts of the body and objects are inherently possessed—that is, they are obligatorily marked for a possessor. When an inherently possessed noun is used in a generic expression, a special indefinite possessor prefix (ša- in most of the languages that have it) is used—e.g. Upper Necaxa šapúškṵ ‘an elder brother/elders brothers in general’ .

Numerals
Numerals in Totonacan languages are bound roots that require a classificatory prefix which changes based on the type, shape or measure of object being counted. This is illustrated for one of the languages Upper Necaxa Totonac in the table below :

In total, Upper Necaxa has around 30 classificatory prefixes .

The following table compares the numeral bases of six Totonacan languages.

Sound symbolism
A prominent feature of Totonacan languages is the presence of sound symbolism (see ; ; ; ; ;). The most common (but by no means only) sound-symbolic pattern in Totonacan involves fricative alterations, typically /s/ ~ /š/ ~ /ɬ/ and occasionally /ts/ ~ /č/ ~ /š/ correlated either with increasingly more energetic or forceful action or with the size of an event participant, as in the following examples from Upper Necaxa Totonac :

Comparative as well as language-internal evidence suggests that the pattern of consonantal alternations may have their origins in affixes indicating grade—s- ‘diminutive‘, š- ‘medium’, ɬ- ‘augmentative’) (see ;). In general, the productivity of the sound-symbolic alternations is highly variable within and across languages of the family, and many languages preserve for a given stem only one of a set of two or three alternates that can be reconstructed for proto-Totonacan .

Totonacan vocabulary
The following selection of Proto-Totonacan reconstructions and descendants is taken from MacKay and Trechsel (2018), using data from several other studies. The reconstructions and descendants are written in Americanist notation.

Media
Totonacan-language programming is carried by the CDI's radio station XECTZ-AM, broadcasting from Cuetzalan, Puebla.

References

External links
Upper Necaxa Totonac Project

Bibliography
 

 (Facsimile). 

 
Agglutinative languages
Languages
Language families
Mesoamerican languages